Lauxania is a genus of small flies of the family Lauxaniidae.

Selected species
L. albipes Wiedemann, 1830
L. albiseta Coquillett, 1898
L. albovittata Loew, 1862
L. anceps Curran, 1938
L. argyrostoma Wiedemann, 1830
L. atrovirens Loew, 1862
L. bilobata Merz, 2001
L. chlorogastra Loew, 1862
L. clypeata Loew, 1862
L. cyanea Fabricius, 1805
L. cylindricornis (Fabricius, 1794)
L. flavipes Bezzi, 1908
L. flavohalterata Shatalkin, 1993
L. gagatina Loew, 1852
L. glabrifrons Perusse & Wheeler, 2000
L. kafarista Perusse & Wheeler, 2000
L. kerzhneri Remm & Elberg, 1980
L. martineki Shatalkin, 1999
L. metallica Wiedemann, 1830
L. minor Martinek, 1974
L. nigrimana Coquillett, 1902
L. oblonga Loew, 1862
L. shewelli Perusse & Wheeler, 2000
L. siciliana Merz, 2001
L. sonora Shatalkin, 1993
L. torso Curran, 1938
L. vitripennis Shatalkin, 1993
L. zinovjevi Elberg, 1993

References

Lauxaniidae
Lauxanioidea genera